Gamer, alternatively spelt Gámer or Gaamer, was a debut feature-length film directed by Oleg Sentsov. It was released in Russian and Ukrainian language in 2011. He tells of a young gamer, who lives with his mother in Simferopol. The premiere was held in 2012 in Rotterdam. The film participated in several international film festivals and was a highly marked by the professional community, in particular, a premium Russian Guild of Film Critics at the festival  Spirit of Fire  in Khanty-Mansiysk.

Plot 
The main character in the film is a teenager named Lyosha, an enthusiastic computer games player, spending all his time in special clubs. Following his passion, he almost did not pay attention to others: neither to his mother, who was distressed by the fact that her son had dropped out of studies, nor to his girlfriend Katya, who was in love with him, nor to any of his friends. In an environment of professional gamers Lyosha becomes one of the best, followed by victories in multiple competitions. In an effort to become the best he embarks on an international gaming tournament in Los Angeles, but he takes only the second place. After returning home, Lyosha gets rid of his gaming devices, and for the first time during the entire film, a smile appears on his face.

Reception 
The film was selected to a number of prestigious international film festivals like Rotterdam and São Paulo with some reviewers evoking comparisons with 400 blows and stating that Sentsov "breaks the barrier that separates cinema from real life. Its box office in Ukraine at the time was minimal, but the film is still accumulating revenue via its online distribution by Rotterdam Unleashed where it can be watched all over the world.

Cast 
 Vladislav Zhuk as Lyosha
 Alexander Fedotov as Bur
 Zhanna Biryuk as mother

Awards and nominations 
São Paulo International Film Festival — Best Foreign Film (nom)

References

External links 
 
  Viewing movie Online International Film Festival Rotterdam  

2011 films
2010s teen drama films
Russian-language Ukrainian films
2011 directorial debut films
Ukrainian drama films
Films set in Ukraine
Films shot in Ukraine
Films about video games
Esports films
2011 drama films